The 1991 Women's World Snooker Championship was a women's snooker tournament played at various venues in the United Kingdom in 1991. Allison Fisher beat Karen Corr 8–2 in the final to win the title, and made a championship record  of 103 in the qualifying rounds.

Tournament summary
The event attracted seventy-one players, from nine different countries. There were eight regional qualifying events, with the winner of each event progressing to the quarter-finals of the tournament. The competition was promoted by Barry Hearn's Matchroom organisation and sponsored by Trusthouse Forte with total prize fund of £40,000. The winner, Allison Fisher received £12,000 as the champion, and Karen Corr received £6,000 as runner-up. The losing semi-finalists received £3,000 each, and the losing quarter-finalists £1,250 each. All of the matches were played in venues managed by the tournament's sponsor, Trusthouse Forte.

Fisher made a break of 103 in her match against Fran Hoad, the first  break in the history of the women's world snooker championship.

The quarter-finals onwards were played at the Hyde Park Hotel in London, and received television coverage on the European satellite channel Screensport.

Mandy Fisher gave birth to a son 96 hours before her quarter-final match with Allison Fisher, and was breastfeeding him ten minutes before the match started. Mandy Fisher scored only 48 points whilst losing the match 0–5.

In the other semi-final, Fisher beat Stacey Hillyard 5–2 in a match where both players made numerous errors.

The final was played on 10 November 1991, which was Corr's 22nd birthday. In the first fame, Corr made a break of 82 which earned her a prize of £400 for the highest break in the televised stages of the tournament. Fisher then took the second frame, before Corr won the third to lead 2–1. Fisher then won the last seven frames in dominant style to win 8–2, finishing the match with a break of 44. As champion, Fisher received an invitation to compete in the 1992 Matchroom League, which, like the women's world championship had been, was sponsored by Trusthouse Forte and promoted by Barry Hearn.

Qualifying
No matches before the semi-finals of any of the qualifying events are shown.

Event 1: Duke's Head, King's Lynn

Event 2: Forte Crest, Swansea
(Only the result of the final is available in the source used)

Event 3: Roebuck Hotel, Buckhurst Hill

Event 4: Forte Crest, Portsmouth

Event 5: Forte Post House, Glasgow

Event 6: Randolph Hotel, Oxford

Event 7: Forte Crest, Nottingham

Event 8: Burford Bridge Hotel, Dorking

Main draw 
Source: Snooker Scene, December 1991

Final

References

World Women's Snooker Championship
1991 in snooker
1991 in English sport